Ethiopia participated at the 2018 Summer Youth Olympics in Buenos Aires, Argentina from 6 October to 18 October 2018.

Medalists

Competitors

Athletics

Boys

Girls

Cycling

Ethiopia qualified a girls' combined team based on its ranking in the Youth Olympic Games Junior Nation Rankings.

 Girls' combined team - 1 team of 2 athletes

Combined team

References

2018 in Ethiopian sport
Nations at the 2018 Summer Youth Olympics
Ethiopia at the Youth Olympics